Henry Glen (July 13, 1739 – January 6, 1814) was a merchant, military officer and politician who served as a Federalist in the United States House of Representatives during the years immediately following the adoption of the United States Constitution.

Early life
Henry Glen was born in Albany in the Province of New York on July 13, 1739, to Jacob Glen and Elizabeth Cuyler.  His sister, Janet (Jannetje), was the wife of Abraham Cuyler, who was the Mayor of Albany from 1770 until 1776 when he was banished for Tory leanings and settled in Canada. His brothers included Johannes (John) Glen and Jacobus (Jacob) Teller Glen. Glens Falls was named for Johannes, and Glenville was named for their ancestor, Sander Leendertse Glen, also known as Alexander Lindsay Glen.

Henry's middle name was Jacob, and his names in Dutch were "Hendrick" (the Dutch version of Henry) and "Jacobse" or "Jacobus." He grew up in the Dutch culture of Albany and Schenectady, and his name often appears in records in English, in Dutch, or in a combination of both languages. In addition, his name is sometimes recorded with his middle name, without his middle name, and with spelling variants, including "Hendrik" and "Hendrick."  His last name also sometimes appears in written records as "Glenn."

Career

Early career
Glen became a merchant and was successful in the Indian Trade and land speculation, operating a company in partnership with his brother Johannes and Jacobus Teller.  He was an early white settler of Schenectady, and was appointed Town Clerk in 1767. He held this post until 1809. He owned slaves.

In the 1760s, Glen was appointed a second lieutenant in his brother's militia company.

American Revolution
At the start of the American Revolution, Glen was appointed commander of the 2nd Company of Schenectady Militia, with the rank of captain.  Glen also served as a member of Schenectady's Committee of Safety.  In addition, he was elected to the New York Provincial Congress.

Glen was later appointed a Continental Army Assistant Deputy Quartermaster General with the rank of major. He then advanced to deputy quartermaster general, and attained the rank of colonel. Quartermasters were responsible for procuring food, horses, wagons, weapons, ammunition, uniforms, tents and other materiel and arranging for them to be distributed to the Infantry, Cavalry and Artillery units.

During the Revolution, Glen also served as one of New York's three Commissioners of Indian Affairs, and was one of the commission's executive agents.  The Commissioners of Indian Affairs were responsible for negotiating with the nations of upstate New York in an effort to end their support for the British, and possibly begin to support the Patriot cause.

Post-American Revolution
After the Revolution, Glen resumed his Schenectady business interests.  An early supporter of what became the Federalist Party, he served in the New York State Assembly from 1786 to 1787.

In 1792, he was a successful candidate for election to the United States House of Representatives. He served four terms, beginning with the Third and through the Sixth Congresses, serving from March 4, 1793, to March 3, 1801.  He was not a candidate for reelection in 1800, and was succeeded by Killian K. Van Rensselaer.

In 1810, Glen returned to the New York Assembly and served one term.

Personal life
In 1762, Henry Glen married Elizabeth (Elisabet) Vischer.  Their children included:
Elisabeth Glen, who married Willem Van Ingen
Catarina Glen, who married Rev. Jacob Sickles
Jannetje Glen
Jacob Glen
Johannes Glen
Cornelius Glen

Glen died in Schenectady on January 6, 1814.  He is presumed to have originally been interred in Schenectady's First Dutch Churchyard.  The remains at this site were later moved to Vale Cemetery, presumably including Glen's. Not all the gravestones from Schenectady's first cemeteries were transported to Vale Cemetery, so the exact location of his grave is not known.

References

External links
Biographic sketch at U.S. Congress website

1739 births
1814 deaths
Politicians from Albany, New York
Military personnel from Albany, New York
People of the Province of New York
Cuyler family
American people of Scottish descent
American people of Dutch descent
American members of the Dutch Reformed Church
Pro-Administration Party members of the United States House of Representatives from New York (state)
Federalist Party members of the United States House of Representatives from New York (state)
Members of the New York Provincial Congress
Members of the New York State Assembly
American slave owners
Politicians from Schenectady, New York
Continental Army officers from New York (state)
Military personnel from Schenectady, New York
New York (state) militiamen in the American Revolution